Jean-Pierre-François Guillot-Duhamel (1730–1816) was a French engineer.

References

1730 births
1816 deaths
Barons of the First French Empire
French engineers
Members of the French Academy of Sciences